Okaukuejo is the administrative center for the Etosha National Park in Namibia. It is approximately 650 km from the capital Windhoek.

Originally the western end of the Red Line, a veterinary control demarcation established in 1896, and the site of a German fort built in 1901, Okaukuejo now houses the Etosha Ecological Institute, founded in 1974; the round watchtower is a remnant of the fort. A major draw for tourists is the permanent waterhole, illuminated at night, which draws all types of wildlife, including elephants, lions and black rhinoceros, particularly during the lengthy dry season.  

The Namibian National Park Service also maintains a tourist camp.  There is a variety of resort facilities from camping sites to housekeeping cottages with braai facilities.  There is also a large swimming pool, a large restaurant and bar.  There are two small stores.  One store sells basic foods and firewood for a braai.

See also 
 German Namibians

References 

 McIntyre, Chris (1998). Namibia: the Bradt Travel Guide. Old Saybrook, CT: Globe Pequot Press
 Camerapix Publishers International (Ed.) (1994). Spectrum Guide to Namibia. Edison, NJ: Hunter Publishing

External links 
 https://namibia-getaways.com/okaukuejo-rest-camp/
 Ministry of Environment and Tourism: Okaukuejo
 Oshana Regional Council 

Etosha National Park